Newton Poppleford railway station is a closed railway station that served the village of Newton Poppleford in East Devon, England. The station was opened by the Budleigh Salterton Railway on 1 June 1899 and closed by British Railways on 6 March 1967.

History

The station was opened as a small station on the Budleigh Salterton Railway.

The station was host to a Southern Railway camping coach from 1935 to 1939. A camping coach was also positioned here by the Southern Region from 1954 to 1964.

Goods facilities were withdrawn in 1964 and the station was downgraded as a halt. The station was completely closed in 1967.

Present state
The station and the bridge over the A3052 road have both since been demolished, with no tangible evidence remaining.

References

Bibliography
 
 
 

Disused railway stations in Devon
Former London and South Western Railway stations
Railway stations in Great Britain opened in 1899
Railway stations in Great Britain closed in 1967
Beeching closures in England